Skares railway station was a railway station serving the former mining village of Skares, East Ayrshire, Scotland. The station was originally part of the Ayr and Cumnock Branch on the Glasgow and South Western Railway.

History 
The station opened on 1 July 1872, and closed on 10 September 1951.

References 
 

Disused railway stations in East Ayrshire
Railway stations in Great Britain opened in 1872
Railway stations in Great Britain closed in 1951
Former Glasgow and South Western Railway stations